is a Japanese footballer currently playing as a midfielder for Iwate Grulla Morioka.

Career statistics

Club
.

Notes

References

2000 births
Living people
Association football people from Saitama Prefecture
Nippon Sport Science University alumni
Japanese footballers
Association football midfielders
J2 League players
Urawa Red Diamonds players
Iwate Grulla Morioka players